Sarwali Peak, also known as Dabbar Peak, Toshe Ri, and Toshain-I, is a mountain peak located at an altitude of  in Azad Jammu and Kashmir, Pakistan. It is located at the junction of the Neelam and Shounter valleys  on Toshain/Rupal Glacier towering in Rupal Valley of Nanga Parbat. It is the highest point in the state of Azad Jammu and Kashmir.

The Kashmir Tourism Department sent an expedition in 2004 (details not available), but there has been no documented successful ascent of the peak.
The ridge line that forms Toshain walls houses Toshain II, Toshain III, Toshain IV and Toshain V (Shounter Peak), which all are technical in nature and heavily glaciated. Three Islamabad-based climbers named Imran Juanidi, Usman Tariq and Khurram Rajput tried to reach the summit but went missing on 31 August 2015 and, despite search and rescue effort, could not be found.

On 29 June 2019, Simon Messner soloed the summit of Toshe III, locally known as Geshot.

References

Mountains of Azad Kashmir